A caddie is a person who carries a golfer's equipment and provides them with other assistance.

Caddie may also refer to:

Arts and entertainment
 Caddie, A Sydney Barmaid, a 1953 Australian embellished autobiographical novel
 Caddie (film), a 1976 Australian film based on the novel
 Caddie, protagonist of Caddie Woodlawn, a children's novel and the musical adaptation

Other uses
 Caddie (bag), a golf bag
 Caddie (CAD system), a software package for computer-aided design
 Caddie (historical occupation), a job running errands in early 18th century Scotland

See also
 Caddy (disambiguation)
 Cady (disambiguation)